Bir Tiguisit, Buir Tiguisit or Bir Tighissit is a locality located in the southern part of Saguia el-Hamra, in Western Sahara. It is located south of Tifariti, near the border with Mauritania. It is currently controlled by the Polisario Front, in the so-called Liberated Territories or Free Zone. The Moroccan authorities have integrated it into the Es-Semara Province in the region of Laâyoune-Sakia El Hamra.

The demining carried out by MINURSO has made this population revitalized. It consists of a small hospital, a school and some small shops.

Bir Tiguisit is located near the remains of the old Spanish colonial town of Colomina and one of the bases of MINURSO.

References

Populated places in Western Sahara